Richard Alan Bonynge  (born 29 September 1930) is an Australian conductor and pianist. He is the widower of Australian dramatic coloratura soprano Dame Joan Sutherland.  Bonynge conducted virtually all of Sutherland's operatic performances from 1962 until her retirement in 1990.

Biography
Bonynge was born in Epping, a suburb of Sydney, and educated at Sydney Boys' High School before studying piano at the Sydney Conservatorium of Music and gaining a scholarship to the Royal College of Music in London, where his piano teacher was Herbert Fryer. He gave up his music scholarship, continuing his private piano studies, and became a coach for singers. One of these was Joan Sutherland, whom he had accompanied in Australia. They married in 1954 and became a duo, performing operatic recitals until 1962. When the scheduled conductor for a recital of operatic arias became ill and the replacement conductor was involved in a car accident, Bonynge stepped in and, from that time on, he conducted virtually all of his wife's performances.

His debut as an opera conductor took place in 1963 in Vancouver, where he conducted Faust. The same year, also in Vancouver, he conducted Norma for the first time, starring Sutherland and Marilyn Horne. He also conducted the English Chamber Orchestra in many recordings.

By doing some research and reading up on Massenet and Italian bel canto composers, Bonynge discovered Massenet's own statement about his opera Esclarmonde being his "best achievement." This filled Bonynge with curiosity, even more because Esclarmonde had sunk into almost total oblivion and had hardly been performed at all since the end of the 19th century. He obtained a tattered vocal score of it in Paris, and subsequently bought the full orchestral score from an auction in New York City. Although Sutherland was initially skeptical about Esclarmonde, Bonynge became an enthusiast of the work and eventually convinced her that she should perform the role of Esclarmonde herself. The San Francisco Opera and the Metropolitan Opera premieres of Esclarmonde took place in 1974 and 1976 respectively.

In 1977 he was the founding music director of the Vancouver Opera Orchestra, when he conducted Le roi de Lahore staged there (in which his wife also took part).

Bonynge made his Metropolitan Opera debut on 12 December 1966, and his last performance there was on 6 April 1991. Most of those performances he conducted there between 1966 and 1987 were with Sutherland singing. From the 1960s until the early 1970s, his speciality was music of 18th and early 19th century, mostly in bel canto repertoire of Rossini, Bellini and Donizetti. Bonynge then gradually added also middle Verdi (La traviata, Rigoletto, Il trovatore), Offenbach (Les Contes d'Hoffmann), then also Massenet (Esclarmonde and Werther).

Bonynge has recorded extensively in the ballet genre: Delibes's three ballets – La Source, Coppélia, Sylvia; Riccardo Drigo's The Magic Flute and Le Réveil de Flore; Jacques Offenbach's Le papillon; Friedrich Burgmüller's La Péri; and Tchaikovsky's three ballets – Swan Lake, The Sleeping Beauty, The Nutcracker. One of Bonynge's most valuable contributions to ballet music is a 10 CD "Compendium of Ballet Rarities" which have been rarely recorded but are often performed by established ballet companies, such as several famous Pas de deux and ballets performed in operas.

His recordings also include some works with no operatic or balletic associations, such as the Harp Concerto in E-flat by Reinhold Glière, with harpist Osian Ellis.

Commencing in 2007, he has conducted a series of performances in a few opera houses around the U.S. (Florida Grand Opera, Michigan Opera Theatre), and now is mostly involved with the Opera Australia company (Lucia di Lammermoor in August 2008, and in 2006 for Opera Queensland; I Capuleti e i Montecchi in Melbourne and Sydney in middle of 2009).

He lives in Les Avants, Switzerland and maintains a home in Sydney.

Videography
 The Metropolitan Opera Centennial Gala (1983), Deutsche Grammophon DVD, 00440-073-4538

Honours and awards

Bonynge was made a Commander of the Order of the British Empire for his services to music in 1977. In 1983, he was made Officer of the Order of Australia, and in 1989 a Commandeur de l'Ordre des Arts et des Lettres. 

On 26 January 2012, Bonynge was promoted within the Order of Australia to Companion, for "eminent service to the performing arts as an acclaimed conductor and musical scholar, to classical singing and the promotion of opera, and through the collection and preservation of operatic manuscripts."

ARIA Music Awards
The ARIA Music Awards is an annual awards ceremony that recognises excellence, innovation, and achievement across all genres of Australian music. They commenced in 1987. 

! 
|-
| 2000
| Amoureuse: Sacred and Profane Arias (with Rosamund Illing and Australian Opera and Ballet Orchestra)
|rowspan="2" | Best Classical Album
| 
|rowspan="2" | 
|-
| 2006
| Piano Concertos: Tchaikovsky, Grieg (with Simon Tedeschi & The Queensland Orchestra)
| 
|-

Bernard Heinze Memorial Award
The Sir Bernard Heinze Memorial Award is given to a person who has made an outstanding contribution to music in Australia.

! 
|-
| 2008 || Richard Bonynge|| Sir Bernard Heinze Memorial Award ||  || 
|-

References

External links
 Image of Dame Joan Sutherland and Richard Bonynge, performing at Opera in the Parktaken by Don McMurdo and held in the National Library of Australia
 Image of Dame Joan Sutherland and Luciano Pavarotti on stage with Richard Bonynge, performing at the Sydney Opera House in 1983taken by Don McMurdo and held in the National Library of Australia
 
 Index page to the Dame Joan Sutherland and Richard Bonynge ephemera collectionheld in the National Library of Australia
 Colbert Artists Management Inc.

1930 births
Living people
Sydney Conservatorium of Music alumni
Alumni of the Royal College of Music
Australian conductors (music)
Musicians from Sydney
Commanders of the Order of the British Empire
Companions of the Order of Australia
Commandeurs of the Ordre des Arts et des Lettres
People educated at Sydney Boys High School
21st-century conductors (music)